"For You to Love" is a 1988 song by the American recording artist Luther Vandross. The single was released in 1989 in support of his hit album Any Love. The song was a top five U.S. R&B hit that peaked to No. 3 on the R&B singles. Vandross' Any Love album charted three top-five singles on the Billboard Hot R&B Singles chart.

Charts

References

External links
 www.luthervandross.com

1988 songs
Luther Vandross songs
1989 singles
Songs written by Marcus Miller
Songs written by Luther Vandross
Epic Records singles